Federal elections were held in Germany on 19 January 1919, although members of the standing army in the east did not vote until 2 February. The elections were the first of the new Weimar Republic, which had been established after World War I and the Revolution of 1918–19, and the first with women's suffrage. The previous constituencies, which heavily overrepresented rural areas, were scrapped, and the elections held using a form of proportional representation. The voting age was also lowered from 25 to 20.  Austrian citizens living in Germany were allowed to vote, with German citizens living in Austria being allowed to vote in the February 1919 Constitutional Assembly elections.

From its inaugural session on 6 February, the National Assembly (Nationalversammlung) functioned as both a constituent assembly and unicameral legislature. The supporting parties of the "Weimar Coalition" (SPD, Zentrum and DDP) together won 76.2% of the votes cast; on 13 February, provisional president Friedrich Ebert appointed Philipp Scheidemann, of the SPD, as Minister-President. The office was later renamed Chancellor when the Weimar Constitution came into force in August 1919. The Scheidemann cabinet replaced the revolutionary Rat der Volksbeauftragten (Council of the People's Deputies). Voter turnout was 83.0%.

Electoral system 
The 423 seats of the National Constituent Assembly were set to be elected in 38 multi-member constituencies of between six and 17 seats using party-list proportional representation. Two seats were reserved for representatives of standing troops in the east of the country. Apparentment was also in effect, allowing parties to form coalitions in constituencies, using one common list (although a party could only win seats if it put forward candidates in those constituencies). The voting age was set at 20.

Results
One constituency established by the Electoral Regulations, Elsass–Lothringen, was unable to hold its elections due to having been annexed by France in the aftermath of World War I, and in another, Posen, amidst the Greater Poland uprising, Poles boycotted the vote.

Representatives of standing troops in the East

References

Germany
Federal
Elections in the Weimar Republic
Federal elections in Germany
Germany